Cerro Castillo is a hamlet southeast of Torres del Paine National Park, and is the head of Torres del Paine commune, in the Magallanes Region.

The village is close to the Argentine border.  The Chilean customs and immigration offices serving the border crossing (officially known as Río Don Guillermo) are located in the village.

References

Geography of Magallanes Region
Hamlets in Chile
Última Esperanza Province
Populated places in Última Esperanza Province